Ugochukwu "Ugo" Okoye (born 13 September 1981) is a Nigerian former professional footballer who played as a midfielder.

Career
Born in Anambra State, Okoye played in the United States for the Charleston Battery, scoring one goals in 34 league appearances during the 2005 and 2006 seasons.

References

1981 births
Living people
Nigerian footballers
Charleston Battery players
USL First Division players
Association football midfielders